Allan Stewart (born January 31, 1964) is a Canadian former professional ice hockey left winger. He played for the New Jersey Devils and Boston Bruins.

Career statistics

External links

1964 births
Boston Bruins players
Canadian ice hockey left wingers
Ice hockey people from British Columbia
Living people
Maine Mariners players
Moncton Hawks players
New Jersey Devils draft picks
New Jersey Devils players
People from Fort St. John, British Columbia
Prince Albert Raiders players
Prince Albert Raiders (SJHL) players
Utica Devils players